Gowerton is the name of an electoral ward in the county of Swansea, Wales, UK.  It is named after Gowerton village which falls within the ward. The Gowerton community boundaries are coterminous with the ward.

The electoral ward consists of some or all of the following areas: Gowerton, Penclawdd, Waunarlwydd, in the parliamentary constituency of Gower.  It is bordered by Penclawdd and Fairwood to the south west; Killay North and Killay South to the south; Cockett to the east; and Lower Loughor, Upper Loughor, the Loughor estuary and Kingsbridge to the north.

The turnout for Gowerton in the 2012 local council elections was 37.02%. The results were:

References

Swansea electoral wards
Gower Peninsula